Jhon Stalin Minda García (born July 21, 1986) is an Ecuadorian footballer currently playing for Club Deportivo El Nacional. He plays as a midfielder.

External links

1986 births
Living people
Association football midfielders
Ecuadorian footballers
C.D. El Nacional footballers